Jacques Majerus (28 March 1916 – 18 January 1972) was a Luxembourgian cyclist. He competed in the individual and team road race events at the 1936 Summer Olympics. He was the brother of racing cyclist Jean Majerus.

References

External links
 

1916 births
1972 deaths
Luxembourgian male cyclists
Olympic cyclists of Luxembourg
Cyclists at the 1936 Summer Olympics
People from Wiltz